PDFescape is an advertising- and fee-supported web-based PDF editor program written in JavaScript, HTML, CSS and ASP. It features PDF editing, form filling, page arrangement, printing, saving, and form publishing. A premium ad free version is available for a fee. Form publishing requires additional fees.

PDFescape offers online storage of PDF documents. PDFescape can be used with common browsers such as Firefox, Internet Explorer, Safari, Chrome, and Opera.

The first release was published on February 20, 2007.

PDFescape has been reviewed by websites such as Cnet and Lifehacker.

Features

PDF documents can be opened within the application itself or imported through the web interface. Open documents can be modified using a set of tools similar, but more limited, than those found in PDF applications such as Adobe Acrobat.

See also
 Online office suite
 List of PDF software

References

External links
Official website

PDF readers
PDF software
Web software

Pdfescape Spanish community